Hrdibořice is a municipality and village in Prostějov District in the Olomouc Region of the Czech Republic. It has about 200 inhabitants.

References

External links

Prospectus about Hrdibořické rybníky National Nature Monument

Villages in Prostějov District